David Paton Balfour (12 July 1841 – 13 July 1894) was a New Zealand sheepfarmer, station manager, roading supervisor and diarist. He was born in Monikie, Forfarshire, Scotland on 12 July 1841.

References

1841 births
1894 deaths
New Zealand farmers
Scottish emigrants to New Zealand
New Zealand diarists
19th-century diarists